Break On Through is the fourth album by German pop singer Jeanette. It was released by Universal Records in 2003 in German-speaking Europe. A limited deluxe edition of the album was also released in 2003, including bonus tracks as well as music videos. The following year, a platinum edition reissue of the album issued, including additional songs.

Track listing

Charts

Weekly charts

Year-end charts

Certifications

References

External links 
 

2003 albums
2004 albums
Jeanette Biedermann albums